Wood turtle may refer to:

 Wood turtle (Glyptemys insculpta), a turtle endemic  to North America
 Neotropical wood turtles (genus Rhinoclemmys) including:
 Brown wood turtle, Rhinoclemmys annulata, a turtle found in Colombia, Costa Rica, Ecuador, Honduras, Nicaragua, and Panama.
 Furrowed wood turtle, Rhinoclemmys areolata
 Maracaibo wood turtle, Rhinoclemmys diademata
 Black wood turtle, Rhinoclemmys funerea, a species of turtle found in Costa Rica, Honduras, Nicaragua, and Panama.
 Colombian wood turtle, Rhinoclemmys melanosterna
 Large-nosed wood turtle, Rhinoclemmys nasuta, a turtle found in Colombia and Ecuador
 Painted wood turtle, Rhinoclemmys pulcherrima
 Spot-legged wood turtle, Rhinoclemmys punctularia
 Mexican spotted wood turtle, Rhinoclemmys rubida, a turtle endemic to Mexico.